Westen may refer to:

Names 
Brodie Westen, head college football coach for the Western Illinois University Leathernecks
Drew Westen, Professor of Psychology and Psychiatry at Emory University in Atlanta, Georgia
Madeline Westen, fictional character portrayed by Sharon Gless in the television series Burn Notice
Marcel van der Westen (born 1976), Dutch hurdler and tax attorney
Michael Westen, fictional character portrayed by Jeffrey Donovan in the television series Burn Notice
Nate Westen, fictional character portrayed by Seth Peterson in the television series Burn Notice
Thomas Edvard von Westen Sylow (1792–1875), the Norwegian Minister of the Army and member of the Council of State Division in Stockholm

Media 
 Westen, a 2013 German drama directed by Christian Schwochow

See also
Sieg im Westen (Victory in the West), a 1941 German propaganda film

nl:West_(doorverwijspagina)